Late Night Tales: Matt Helders is a 2008 DJ mix album, mixed by Matt Helders from the band Arctic Monkeys. It is the 21st album in the Late Night Tales/Another Late Night DJ series.

Track listing

Personnel
 Matt Helders − production, mixing, drums, keyboards
 Nesreen Shah − vocals (8)
 Alex Turner − spoken word (20)

References

Helders, Matt
Arctic Monkeys
2008 compilation albums
DJ mix albums